PM Yoga Awards, officially named as PM's Awards for Outstanding Contribution for Promotion and Development of Yoga are the annual awards by Prime Minister of India for recognizing contribution in promotion and development of Yoga. The institution of the award was announced by the Prime Minister Narendra Modi on the occasion of the Second International Day of Yoga at Chandigarh on 21 June 2016.

The Award
Award includes Trophy, Certificate and Cash Prize of ₹2.5 Million each.It has four categories:

Individual (National)
Individual (International)
Organisation (National)
Organisation (International)

List of Award Winners

Selection Process
The guidelines for awards were developed by AYUSH Ministry and Nominations for awards are invited through open advertisement. Two committees are constituted to evaluate the nominations - Screening Committee (for preliminary evaluation) and Evaluation Committee (Jury).

See also
 Yoga
 International Day of Yoga

References

External links
Tamara Yoga

Yoga organizations
Indian awards